List of governors of Guerrero since it became a state of Mexico in 1917.

References

See also
 List of Mexican state governors

Guerrero